In Labrador, Canada, the North Atlantic Craton is known as the Nain Province. The Nain geologic province was intruded by the Nain Plutonic Suite, which divides the province into the northern Saglek block and the southern Hopedale block.

North Atlantic Craton

The North Atlantic Craton is exposed in parts of the coast of Labrador, parts of central Greenland, the Scourian Complex of northwestern Scotland and is unexposed in northern Norway. The North Atlantic Craton fragmented 2450 to 2000 million years ago. When North America and Europe rejoined, the North Atlantic Craton was triangular shaped with each side ; this unit was separated when the Labrador Sea formed 61 to 40 million years ago. The Nain Province was intruded by the 1350- to 1290-million-year-old Nain Plutonic Suite; composite anorthosite-granitic intrusions which divide the Nain Province into the northern Saglek Block and the southern Hopedale Block.

Nain Province

In Labrador, the North Atlantic Craton is known as the Nain Province or Nain Craton. These two blocks appear to represent two distinct Archean cratonic nuclei, each with its own mineral depositional history. 
Major granitic intrusions – the Wheeler Mountain, Halbach, Alliger, Sheet Hill, Loon Island, Red Island, and Satok Island intrusions – form a north-trending  linear chain which have a southerly decrease in age – 2135-million-year-old Wheeler Mountain granite in the north to the 2025-million-year-old Satok Island monzonite in the south. The Nain Province was then intruded by the 1350- to 1290-million-year-old Nain Plutonic Suite; composite anorthosite-granitic intrusions which divide the Nain Province into the northern Saglek block and the southern Hopedale block. The Torngat orogen developed during the oblique convergence of the Superior and Nain Provinces 900 million years ago.  

Saglek block

This block is a high-grade gneiss terrane; it has no greenstone belts. Within the gneiss are variably-sized enclaves ranging from anorthosite to ultramafic. There are also three small anorthositic, ultramafic meta-igneous complexes in the gneiss near Okak Bay.

The northward–trending Handy fault separates the Saglek block into two metamorphic parts. The gneiss complex on the western side of the Handy fault has rocks that crystallized under granulite facies conditions; this western block is more deeply exposed than the eastern one. On the eastern side amphibolite facies rocks are exposed in the northern part; they transition to granulite facies to the south.

Hopedale block

Hopedale, Labrador, is at the eastern midpoint. This block contains the 3100-million-year-old Hunt River and 3000-million-year-old Florence Lake greenstone belts, and the Weekes amphibolite which represents remnants of the older Hunt River greenstone belt.

References

Geologic provinces of Canada
Historical tectonic plates
Cratons
Greenstone belts
Geology of Newfoundland and Labrador